Hou Xiaolan (born June 3, 1980 in Shaoguan, Guangdong) is a Chinese field hockey player who competed in the 2000 Summer Olympics and in the 2004 Summer Olympics.

In 2000, she was part of the Chinese team which finished fifth in the women's competition. She played all seven matches.

Four years later, Hou finished fourth with the Chinese team in the women's competition. She played all six matches.

References

External links
 
 
 
 
 

1980 births
Living people
Chinese female field hockey players
Field hockey players at the 2000 Summer Olympics
Field hockey players at the 2004 Summer Olympics
Olympic field hockey players of China
People from Shaoguan
Asian Games medalists in field hockey
Sportspeople from Guangdong
Field hockey players at the 2002 Asian Games
Asian Games gold medalists for China
Medalists at the 2002 Asian Games